Reuden (official name: Reuden/Anhalt) is a village and a former municipality in the district of Anhalt-Bitterfeld, in Saxony-Anhalt, Germany. It is around 50 km east of Magdeburg, and around 100 km south-west of Berlin. Since 1 January 2010, it is part of the town Zerbst.

Former municipalities in Saxony-Anhalt
Zerbst